Bryantiella may refer to:
 Bryantiella (beetle), a genus of beetles in the family Chrysomelidae
 Bryantiella (plant), a genus of flowering plants in the family Polemoniaceae

See also
 Bryantella (genus of spiders)